The orange-bellied manakin (Lepidothrix suavissima), also known as the tepui manakin, is a species of bird in the family Pipridae. It resembles and is closely related to the white-fronted manakin (L. serena), and the two were formerly considered conspecific.

It is, as suggested by its alternative common name, restricted to humid forest growing on the tepuis in southern Venezuela, far northern Brazil, and central Guyana.

References

orange-bellied manakin
Birds of the Guianas
Birds of Venezuela
orange-bellied manakin
orange-bellied manakin
orange-bellied manakin
Taxonomy articles created by Polbot
Birds of the Tepuis